South Korea participated in the 2011 Asian Winter Games held in Almaty and Astana, Kazakhstan, from 30 January to 6 February 2011.

Medal summary

Medal table

Medalists

Gold
Alpine skiing
 Men's combined – Jung Dong-hyun
 Women's downhill – Kim Sun-joo
 Women's super-G – Kim Sun-joo

Cross-country skiing
 Women's 10 km – Lee Chae-won

Short track speed skating
 Men's 1500 m – Noh Jin-kyu
 Women's 1000 m – Park Seung-hi
 Women's 1500 m – Cho Ha-ri
 Men's 5000 m relay – Lee Ho-suk, Noh Jin-kyu, Sung Si-bak, Kim Byeong-jun, Um Cheon-ho

Speed skating
 Men's 5000 m – Lee Seung-hoon
 Men's 10000 m – Lee Seung-hoon
 Men's mass start – Lee Seung-hoon
 Women's mass start – Noh Seon-yeong
 Women's team pursuit – Lee Ju-yeon, Noh Seon-yeong, Park Do-young

Silver
Alpine skiing
 Women's combined – Jeong So-ra

Short track speed skating
 Men's 1500 m – Um Cheon-ho
 Women's 1000 m – Cho Ha-ri
 Women's 1500 m – Park Seung-hi
 Women's 3000 m relay – Park Seung-hi, Cho Ha-ri, Yang Shin-young, Hwang Hyun-sun

Ski orienteering
 Women's relay – Kim Ja-Youn, Lee Ha-na, Choi Seul-bi

Speed skating
 Men's 500 m – Lee Kang-seok
 Men's 1500 m – Mo Tae-bum
 Men's team pursuit – Lee Kyou-hyuk, Mo Tae-bum, Lee Seung-hoon  
 Women's 1500 m – Noh Seon-yeong
 Women's 3000 m – Kim Bo-reum
 Women's 5000 m – Park Do-young

Bronze
Alpine skiing
 Men's downhill – Jung Dong-hyun
 Men's combined – Kim Woo-sung
 Women's super-G – Jung Hye-mi

Cross-country skiing
 Men's 4 x 10 km relay – Lee Jun-gil, Im Eui-gyu, Ha Tae-bok, Park Byung-joo
 Men's team sprint – Park Byung-joo, Jung Eui-myung

Figure skating
 Ladies' singles – Kwak Min-jeong

Ice hockey
 Men's top division – Eum Hyun-Seung, Park Sung-Je, Kim Woo-jae, Kim Yoon-hwan, Kim Woo-young, Lee Don-ku, Kim Dong-hwan, Kim Hyun-soo, Kim Sang-wook, Kim Hyeok, Song Dong-hwan, Kim Kyu-hun, Kim Geun-ho, Kim Won-jung, Kim Ki-sung, Park Woo-sang, Kwon Tae-an, Cho Min-ho, Sin Sang-woo, Choi Jung-sik, Lee Yong-jun, Suh Sin-il, Ahn Hyun-min

Short track speed skating
 Men's 1000 m – Sung Si-bak

Ski jumping
 Large hill team – Choi Heung-chul, Kang Chil-ku, Choi Yong-jik, Kim Hyun-ki

Ski orienteering
 Women's long distance – Kim Ja-youn

Speed skating
 Men's 1500 m – Lee Kyou-hyuk
 Women's 500 m – Lee Sang-hwa
 Women's mass start – Lee Ju-youn

Alpine skiing

South Korea sent 5 athletes to compete in the alpine skiing event.
Men

Women

Biathlon

South Korea sent 10 athletes to compete in the biathlon event.

Men

Women

Cross-country skiing

South Korea sent 9 athletes to compete in cross -country skiing event.

Men

Women

Figure skating

South Korea sent 3 athletes to compete in the figure skating event.

Men

Women

Freestyle skiing

Men

Women

Ice hockey

South Korea will send both a men's and women's team. The men's team will compete in the top division.

Men's competition

Top division
Group A 

All times are local (UTC+6).

Men's roster
Eum Hyun-seung, Park Sung-je, Kim Woo-jae, Kim Yoon-hwan, Kim Woo-young, Lee Don-ku, Kim Dong-hwan, Kim Hyun-soo, Kim Sang-wook, Kim Hyeok, Song Dong-hwan, Kim Kyu-hun, Kim Geun-ho, Kim Won-jung, Kim Ki-sung, Park Woo-sang, Kwon Tae-an, Cho Min-ho, Sin Sang-woo, Choi Jung-sik, Lee Yong-jun, Suh Sin-il, Ahn Hyun-min

Women's competition 
Group A

All times are local (UTC+6).

Women's roster
Lee Young-hwa, Hwangbo Young, Kim Eun-Jin, Choi Bo-Young, Jo Kyoo-young, Lee Kyou-sun, Ko Chea-ryung, Han Soo-jin, Han Jae-yeon, Park Da-yun, Hong Yong-joo, Shin So-jung, Yong Hwa-yeon, Ahn Kun-young, Lee Min-ji, Lee Yeon-jeong, Han Do-hee, Ko Hye-in

Short track speed skating

South Korea sent 10 athletes to compete in the short track speed skating event.

Men

Women

Ski jumping

South Korea sent 4 athletes to compete in the ski jumping event.

Men

Ski orienteering

South Korea sent 5 athletes to compete in the ski orienteering event.

Men

Women

Speed skating

South Korea sent 13 athletes to compete in the speed skating event.

Men

Women

References

Nations at the 2011 Asian Winter Games
Asian Winter Games